Pan Am Express was a brand name for a code sharing passenger feed service operated by other airlines on behalf of Pan American World Airways (Pan Am). It was founded in the early 1980s, and lasted until the demise of Pan Am in 1991.

History

In 1980, Pan American World Airways acquired National Airlines, thus obtaining a domestic route network in the U.S. for the first time in its history. In order to provide connecting passenger service to smaller destinations, the creation of a feeder network soon became necessary.

For this task, a number of airlines flying narrow body jet equipment and/or turboprop aircraft were contracted via code sharing agreements:

Air Atlanta (from 1984 to 1987)
Emerald Air (from 1981 until 1985)
Empire Airlines (until 1985)
Pacific Express
Presidential Airways (only during 1987)
 Republic Airlines (until 1986)

The focus of the Pan Am Express network was put on feeding into Pan Am's hub at John F. Kennedy International Airport (JFK). The northeastern U.S. was particularly well covered, but there were also feeder service flights operated in Arizona, California, Florida  and Texas as well as the midwestern and southern U.S.

In 1987, Pan Am acquired Ransome Airlines, which was subsequently renamed Pan Am Express and began operating under the banner and aircraft livery of Pan Am. It fully concentrated on serving the JFK hub and also operated a second feeder network in Europe, offering regional flights out of Berlin Tegel Airport. Pan Am Express also operated flights between Los Angeles (LAX) and San Diego (SAN) which were not linked to any other smaller destinations in the regional network. When Pan Am declared bankruptcy in early 1991 and was forced to sell its New York hub to Delta Air Lines, Pan Am Express continued to operate the northeast regional system and the Miami system for Pan Am until the brand was shut down together with its parent on December 4, 1991. On that date, Ransome / Pan Am Express was sold to TransWorld Airlines and began operating the same system for TWA from 5 Dec 1991 until Nov 1995 when TWA shut down this operation. See: Ransome Airlines entry for more detail

Route network
Between 1983 and 1991, the Pan Am Express branding was used on flights to the following destinations in the United States, Canada and the Bahamas:

In Europe, the following destinations were served:

Fleet

The following aircraft types were used on Pan Am Express flights:

See also 
 List of defunct airlines of the United States

References

Defunct regional airline brands
Pan Am